Slab or SLAB may refer to:

Physical materials
 Concrete slab, a flat concrete plate used in construction
 Stone slab, a flat stone used in construction
 Slab (casting), a length of metal
 Slab (geology), that portion of a tectonic plate that is subducting
 Slab pull force, the tectonic plate force due to subduction
 Slab suction, one of the major plate tectonic driving forces
 Slab window, a gap that forms in a subducted  oceanic plate
 Slab (fossil) and counter slab, the two counterparts of a fossil impression
 Slab hut, a kind of dwelling  made from slabs of split or sawn timber
 Slab of beer, a flat package containing a large number of cans of beer

Places
 Slab Point, a rocky point in the South Shetland Islands, Antarctica

United States
 Slab, West Virginia, an unincorporated community  in Ritchie County, West Virginia
 Slab City, California, a locality in the Colorado Desert
 Slab City, Wisconsin, an unincorporated community in Shawano County, Wisconsin
 Slab Fork, a tributary of the Guyandotte River in southern West Virginia

Media and entertainment
 Slab (comics), a fictional character in the Marvel Comics Universe
 The Slab, a 2004 UK poetry anthology
 Slab, a character in The Ripping Friends
 Slab, a character in Doctor Who
 SLAB!, 1980s industrial music group
 The Slab, or Slabside Penitentiary, a metahuman prison in the DC Comics universe
  Slab, a character in "Mr. Young"

Technology
 Slab (unit), a 12-bit unit of computer memory on the NCR 315
 Slab allocation, a computer memory management mechanism
 Bar (form), a mobile phone form factor also known as a slab
 Slab serif, a kind of typeface
 Slab construction, a building method

Mathematics
 Slab (geometry), the volume between two parallel planes

Organisations
 Scottish Legal Aid Board
 Silicon Laboratories (NASDAQ symbol)

Other uses
 Slab of Bacon, a traveling trophy in American college football rivalry games
 Thomas Murphy (Irish republican) (born 1946), nicknamed "Slab"
 Student loan asset-backed security, an asset-backed security
 "S.L.A.B. theory", a term coined by David Bordwell to refer to theories that use the ideas of Saussure, Lacan, Althusser, and/or Barthes
 "Slab", a disc golf distance driver by Infinite Discs
 Stupendously large black hole (SLAB), a hypothetical region of spacetime